John Bauer may refer to:

John Bauer (illustrator) (1882–1918), Swedish painter and illustrator 
John Bauer (potter) (born 1978), South African ceramicist and artist
John Bauer (American painter) (born 1971), American artist
John Bauer (skier) (born 1969), American cross country skier
John Bauer (American football) (born 1932), former American football guard and tackle

See also
Jack Bauer (disambiguation)
John Bower (1940–2017), American skier